Emirler is a  village in Tarsus district of Mersin Province, Turkey. It is situated in the Toros Mountains and extreme east of the province. The population of village was 181  as of 2012. According to oral tradition, the village was founded by a tribe from Turkestan. The tribe was split into three and while two other parts founded the villages with the same name near Mersin and near Ulukışla (Niğde Province) the third part founded Emirler in Tarsus district.

References

Villages in Tarsus District